Robert Conti (born November 21, 1945) is an American jazz guitarist and educator.

Conti was born in Philadelphia and was an autodidact, first performing locally at age fourteen and mentoring with Pat Martino. In 1966, after four years on the road touring North America, he settled in Jacksonville, Florida. In 1970, he dropped out of the music business to work in the securities field. In 1976 he began playing jazz again, and 1979, he signed to the Los Angeles–based Discovery Records label. Conti released Latin Love Affair and a Direct To Disc recording titled Solo Guitar as his debut efforts as a leader in 1979. In 1982 he left music again for the business world.  In 1985 he managed to released another album, and in 1986 he headlined the Florida National Jazz Festival, with Jimmy McGriff and Nick Brignola as his sidemen. In mid-1988 he was offered a position under filmmaker Dino De Laurentiis in Beverly Hills, California. After a lengthy recovery from a back injury in late 1988, he was offered a position as resident jazz guitarist at the Irvine Marriott, a job he held until 1998.

Since starting his website in 2000, he has released 30 educational DVDs on jazz guitar, including pro chord melody and improvisation using his No Modes No Scales approach to teaching jazz guitar.  In 2009, he released his own line of solid spruce thinline archtop jazz guitars.

Playing style
Robert Conti advocates the use of a very thin plectrum (0.38mm) for playing single note improvisation, however, he uses fingerstyle when performing chord melody.

Discography

As leader
 Solo Guitar (Trend, 1979)
 Latin Love Affair (Verydisco, 1979)
 Jazz Quintet (Discovery, 1981)
 Laura (Trend, 1985)
 The Living Legends (contains tracks recorded by Robert Conti and tracks recorded by Joe Pass) (Discovery, 1985)
 Comin' On Strong (Time Is, 1990)
 To the Brink! Featuring Rocco Barbato (Pinnacle, 2007)

As sideman
 Gerald Wilson, Lomelin (Discovery, 1981)

References

External links
Official site 
Conti Guitars 
[ Robert Conti] at Allmusic
Las Vegas Sun article

American jazz guitarists
Living people
1945 births
American jazz educators
Seven-string guitarists
Guitarists from Philadelphia
20th-century American guitarists
Jazz musicians from Pennsylvania
Educators from Pennsylvania